Michael Eben Dyal (born May 20, 1966) is a former American football tight end who played four seasons in the National Football League (NFL) with the Los Angeles Raiders, Kansas City Chiefs and San Diego Chargers. He played college football at Texas A&M University–Kingsville and attended Tivy High School in Kerrville, Texas.

References

External links
Just Sports Stats

Living people
1966 births
Players of American football from San Antonio
American football tight ends
Texas A&M–Kingsville Javelinas football players
Los Angeles Raiders players
Kansas City Chiefs players
San Diego Chargers players